Cormac Michael Breslin (25 April 1902 – 23 January 1978) was an Irish Fianna Fáil politician who served as Ceann Comhairle of Dáil Éireann from 1967 to 1973. He served as a Teachta Dála (TD) from 1937 to 1977.

He was born in Bunbeg, Gweedore, County Donegal. He was educated at St Eunan's College, Letterkenny and, while Leas-Cheann Comhairle, attended the Golden Jubilee there in September 1956.

He was first elected to Dáil Éireann as a Fianna Fáil Teachta Dála (TD) for the Donegal West constituency at the 1937 general election. He was re-elected at every election until his retirement in 1977, switching constituency to Donegal South-West in 1961 and to Donegal–Leitrim in 1969. He served as Ceann Comhairle of Dáil Éireann from 1967 to 1973, and as Leas-Cheann Comhairle from 1951 to 1967. He is credited for helping found the industrial estate in Gweedore, and also the turf burning station—a source of employment in his local parish, which allowed local people to cut the turbary and sell it to the station operated by the Electrical Supply Board (ESB), situated in Min a Cuing. 

In November 1931 he married Antoinette Wilman, and they had ten children.

References

 

1902 births
1978 deaths
Fianna Fáil TDs
Members of the 9th Dáil
Members of the 10th Dáil
Members of the 11th Dáil
Members of the 12th Dáil
Members of the 13th Dáil
Members of the 14th Dáil
Members of the 15th Dáil
Members of the 16th Dáil
Members of the 17th Dáil
Members of the 18th Dáil
Members of the 19th Dáil
Members of the 20th Dáil
People educated at St Eunan's College
People from Gweedore
Politicians from County Donegal
Presiding officers of Dáil Éireann